Mark Mitera (born October 22, 1987) is an American former professional ice hockey player. Mitera was drafted by the Anaheim Ducks in the first round, 19th overall, in the 2006 NHL Entry Draft. He last played for the Reading Royals of the ECHL in 2012–13.

Playing career
Mitera joined the University of Michigan for the 2005-06 season after playing two seasons with the U.S. National Team Development Program.

During his final season with Michigan, Mitera tore his ACL and underwent successful surgery. He returned to the Wolverines lineup and finished the season with one goal and two assists in eight games. After four seasons with the Michigan Wolverines men's ice hockey team in the Central Collegiate Hockey Association (CCHA), Mitera signed a three-year, entry-level contract with the Ducks on March 30, 2009.

On July 15, 2011, Mitera was traded by the Ducks to the Montreal Canadiens for Mathieu Carle. On January 10, 2013, Mitera signed for the remainder of the 2012–13 season with the Reading Royals of the ECHL.

Career statistics

Awards and honors

References

External links

1987 births
Living people
Abbotsford Heat players
American men's ice hockey defensemen
Anaheim Ducks draft picks
Bakersfield Condors (1998–2015) players
Grand Rapids Griffins players
Hamilton Bulldogs (AHL) players
Ice hockey players from Michigan
Iowa Stars players
Michigan Wolverines men's ice hockey players
National Hockey League first-round draft picks
Sportspeople from Royal Oak, Michigan
Reading Royals players
San Antonio Rampage players
Syracuse Crunch players